All Our Saturdays is a British sitcom starring Diana Dors that aired in 1973. Stuart Harris wrote two episodes, while Oliver Free, Eric Geen, Anthony Crouch and Peter Robinson & David Rutherford all wrote one each. It was made for the ITV network by Yorkshire Television.

It followed Dors' success in Queenie's Castle.

Cast
Diana Dors as Di Dorkins
Tony Caunter as Ken Hicks
Norman Jones as Stan Maycock
Anthony Jackson as Frank Bosomworth
John Comer as Wilf
Doug Fisher as Ronnie Rendell

Plot
Di, known as 'Big D', runs a large textile company called Garsley Garments and also is the manager of the local rugby league team. Always at the bottom of the league, she renames the team Frilly Things and sets about reviving their fortunes.

Episodes
"Charity Meets Its Match" (14 February 1973)
"The Unhappy Hooker" (21 February 1973)
"100 Years of Outstanding Underthings" (28 February 1973)
"The Ref Is Always Right?" (7 March 1973)
"Come Home Stan Maycock" (14 March 1973)
"When The Nobbling Had To Stop" (21 March 1973)

References
Mark Lewisohn, "Radio Times Guide to TV Comedy", BBC Worldwide Ltd, 2003
British TV Comedy Guide for All Our Saturdays

Notes

External links

1973 British television series debuts
1973 British television series endings
1970s British sitcoms
ITV sitcoms
Television series by Yorkshire Television